Moray is both a surname and a given name. Notable people with the name include:

Surname:
 Andrew Moray, military leader during the Anglo-Scottish conflict of the late 1290
 Ann Moray (1909–1981), Welsh singer and novelist
 Jim Moray (born 1981), English singer, multi-instrumentalist and record producer
 John Moray Stuart-Young (1881–1939), English poet
 Sir Robert Moray (1608/9–1673), Scottish soldier, freemason and natural philosopher
 Thomas Henry Moray (1892–1974), American inventor involved in "free energy" generation
 Stella Moray (1923–2006), English actress
 Ursula Moray Williams (1911-2006) Children's writer and illustrator

Given name:
 Moray Callum (born 1958), Scottish automobile designer
 Moray Hunter (born 1958), Scottish comedian
 Moray Low (born 1984), Scottish rugby player
 Moray Watson (born 1928), English actor

See also
Murray (disambiguation)